Dragon Inn (also known as Dragon Gate Inn) is a 1967 Taiwanese wuxia film written and directed by King Hu. The film was remade in 1992, as New Dragon Gate Inn, and again in 2011 as The Flying Swords of Dragon Gate.

Plot
Tsao, the emperor's first eunuch, has successfully bested General Yu, his political opponent. The general was beheaded and his remaining children have been exiled from China. As the children are being escorted to the western border of the Chinese empire, Tsao plots to have the children killed. Tsao's secret police lie in ambush at the desolate Dragon Gate Inn. Martial arts expert Hsiao shows up at the inn, wanting to meet the innkeeper. Unknown to the secret police is that the innkeeper, Wu Ming, was one of the general's lieutenants and has summoned Hsiao to help the children. A brother-sister martial-artist team (children of another Yu lieutenant) also show up to help. These four race to find Yu's children and lead them to safety.

Cast
 Shih Chun as Xiao Shao-zi
 Shangkuan Ling-fung as Miss Zhu
 Bai Ying as Cao Shao-qin
 Miao Tien as Pi Shao-tang
 Han Ying-chieh as Mao Zong-xian
 Hsieh Han as Zhu Ji
 Tsao Chien as Wu Ning

Production
In 1965, director King Hu left the Hong Kong-based Shaw Brothers Studio just after completing Come Drink with Me. Hu left for Taiwan where he met with Sha Rongfeng. The two created the short-lived studio called the Union Film Company. Dragon Inn was shot in Taiwan in 1966.

Release
Dragon Inn premiered in 1967. It was first screened in the United States in 1968 at an academic conference organized by translator and scholar Joseph Lau Shiu-Ming. The film's digital restoration premiered in North America at the 2014 Toronto International Film Festival.
Dragon Inn was released in the United Kingdom on Blu-ray and DVD by the Masters of Cinema Series.
It was released in the United States on Blu-ray July 2018 by the Criterion Collection.

Reception
At the 1968 Golden Horse Awards, Dragon Inn won the award for Best Screenplay and was a runner-up for Best Director.

Retrospective reception of the film in Taiwan is positive. In 2011, the Taipei Golden Horse Film Festival had 122 industry professionals take part in the survey. This voters included film scholars, festival programmers, film directors, actors and producers to vote for the 100 Greatest Chinese-Language Films. Dragon Inn tied with Wong Kar-wai's In the Mood for Love (2000) for ninth place on the list.

In the United Kingdom, Empire gave the film four stars out five, referring to it as a "A keystone of the wuxia genre" and noted that the film "may lack plot complexity and period spectacle. But the stand-off in a remote inn is flecked with tension, wit and slick martial artistry." Michael Brooke (Sight & Sound) referred to Dragon Inn as "one of the most important wuxia pian films to emerge from the Chinese-speaking world prior to the great martial arts boom of the turn of the 1970s." and that it was "riotously entertaining". Brooks commented on the action scenes, opining that they "aren't quite as breath-catchingly dexterous as the ones Hong Kong cinema would later produce, they're both lively and agreeably frequent, with Hu using the Scope frame to its full advantage". Brooke concluded that "If it's not quite first-rank Hu when set against A Touch of Zen or The Fate of Lee Khan, it makes for a superb introduction." The Radio Times gave the film a four out of five star rating, and felt the film surpassed Come Drink With Me, noting that Hu's "control over camera movement and composition is exemplary, building the tension and invigorating the swordplay."

Box office
The film set box‐office records in Taiwan, Korea, and the Philippines. The film was the second-highest grossing film in Hong Kong in 1968 behind You Only Live Twice.

The Union Film Company did not make a great profit from the film however, as they had a deal with Shaw Brothers who owned the distribution rights to Dragon Inn in Hong Kong and Southeast Asia. Shaw Brothers had this deal as via an exchange that was done in trade for letting King Hu break his contract with them to work on Dragon Inn.

Aftermath and influence
Dragon Inn was remade twice, first as New Dragon Gate Inn (1992) and again in 2011 as Flying Swords of Dragon Gate.

Taiwanese director Tsai Ming-Liang directed the critically acclaimed film Goodbye, Dragon Inn (2003). The film is set in a decrepit Taipei movie theater on its final night in business which is screening Dragon Inn. The film's characters either watch the film very closely or are humorously distracted from it.

See also
Cinema of Taiwan
List of Taiwanese films before 1970

References

Sources

External links

Collection of reviews of Dragon Inn (1967)
Dragon Inn: Poised for Battle an essay by Andrew Chan at the Criterion Collection

1967 films
1960s martial arts films
Taiwanese martial arts films
1960s Mandarin-language films
Wuxia films
Films directed by King Hu
Films shot in Taiwan
Films set in 15th-century Ming dynasty